Langfang North railway station, formerly known as Langfang railway station before June 1, 2011, is a railway station situated between Beijing and Tianjin, in Langfang, Hebei. It is served by the conventional Beijing–Shanghai railway and is situated adjacent to Langfang railway station, which is served by high-speed trains. An underground passage links the two.

References 

Stations on the Beijing–Shanghai Railway
Railway stations in Hebei
Railway stations in China opened in 1895